Carl Ward Dudley (1910–1973) was an American film director and producer. He was best known for directing and producing short travelogues.

Biography

Early life
Carl Ward Dudley was born on December 31, 1910, in Little Rock, Arkansas.

Career
He became a film director and producer. Indeed, in 1944, he founded the Dudley Pictures Corporation, a film production company.

In the 1950s, he produced thirty documentary shorts in the This World of Ours series. In 1958, he directed and produced the Cinerama feature South Seas Adventure.

Personal life
He married Eleanor Murphy, the sister of screenwriter Richard Murphy (1912-1993). One of their daughters, Carol Ward Dudley, married producer Gabriel Katzka (1931–1990).

Death
He died on September 2, 1973, in Hong Kong.

Filmography

As a director
Our African Frontier (documentary, short film, 1943).
Our Alaskan Frontier (documentary, short film, 1943).
Star Spangled City (documentary, short film, 1946).
All Aboard (short film, 1946).
Rhythm of a Big City (documentary, short film, 1948).
Pigskin Skill (short film, 1948).
Cradle of the Republic (documentary, short film, 1949).
Hawaiian Sports (short film, 1951).
Aloha Nui (documentary, short film, 1953).
Fish Tales (short film, 1954).
Coney Island Holiday (documentary, short film, 1954).
Below the Rio Grande (documentary, short film, 1954).
Valley of the Sun (documentary, short film, 1954).
Sportsman's Holiday (documentary, short film, 1955).
Journey to the Sea (documentary, short film, 1955).
Heart of an Empire (documentary, short film, 1955).
VistaVision Visits Gibraltar (documentary, short film, 1956).
VistaVision Visits Panama (documentary, short film, 1956).
Viva! Cuba (documentary, short film, 1956).
Magic in the Sun (documentary, short film, 1956).
Under Carib Skies (documentary, short film, 1957).
South Seas Adventure (1958)

As a producer
This World of Ours: Norway (documentary, short film, 1950).
This World of Ours: Denmark (documentary, short film, 1950).
This World of Ours: Glacier National Park (documentary, short film, 1950).
This World of Ours: Sweden (documentary, short film, 1950).
This World of Ours: France (documentary, short film, 1950).
This World of Ours: Holland (documentary, short film, 1950).
This World of Ours: London (documentary, short film, 1951).
This World of Ours: Portugal (documentary, short film, 1951).
This World of Ours: Spain (documentary, short film, 1951).
This World of Ours: England (documentary, short film, 1951).
This World of Ours: Hawaii (documentary, short film, 1951).
This World of Ours: Greece (documentary, short film, 1951).
This World of Ours: Belgium (documentary, short film, 1951).
This World of Ours: Switzerland (documentary, short film, 1951).
This World of Ours: Italy (documentary, short film, 1951).
This World of Ours: Egypt (documentary, short film, 1951).
This World of Ours: Puerto Rico (documentary, short film, 1952).
This World of Ours: Chile (documentary, short film, 1952).
This World of Ours: India (documentary, short film, 1952).
This World of Ours: Ceylon (documentary, short film, 1953).
This World of Ours: Singapore (documentary, short film, 1953).
This World of Ours: Germany (documentary, short film, 1953).
This World of Ours: Japan (documentary, short film, 1953).
This World of Ours: Hong Kong (documentary, short film, 1954).
This World of Ours: Formosa (documentary, short film, 1954).
This World of Ours: Ireland (documentary, short film, 1954).
This World of Ours: Thailand (documentary, short film, 1954).
This World of Ours: Bali (documentary, short film, 1954).
This World of Ours: Venezuela (documentary, short film, 1955).
The Mississippi Traveler (documentary, short film, 1955).
This World of Ours: Caribbean Sky Cruise (documentary, short film, 1955).
This World of Ours: Turkey (documentary, short film, 1955).
VistaVision Visits Gibraltar (documentary, short film, 1956).
Hero on Horseback (documentary, short film, 1956).
VistaVision Visits Panama (documentary, short film, 1956).
VistaVision Visits Austria (documentary, short film, 1956).
South Seas Adventure (1958).

As an executive producer
Tobor the Great (1954).
The Days of Our Years (short film, documentary, 1955).

External links
"Carl Dudley Dies; Film Producer, 63."  New York Times, September 4, 1973.
Slide, Anthony.  "Dudley Pictures Corporation," The New Historical Dictionary of the American Film Industry, p. 60.  London:  Routledge, 2013.  .

References

1910 births
1973 deaths
Artists from Little Rock, Arkansas
American film directors
American film producers
20th-century American businesspeople